Murina is a genus of bats. It may also refer to:

Murina (film), a 2021 film by Antoneta Alamat Kusijanović

See also
Morina (disambiguation)